Luvungi is a town in the Eastern Democratic Republic of the Congo situated on the Ruzizi River plain at the borders of Walungu and Uvira Territories in the province of South Kivu. It is close to both Rwandan and Burundian frontiers. It is believed to have a population of approximately 85,000 who represent a mix of ethnic Fulero, Vira, Bembe, Barega, Bashi, Burundians and Banyamulenge. Its economy is founded mainly on subsistence agriculture and the artisanal mining of cassiterite, an ore of tin.

The Germans attacked the Belgians here on 29 September 1913 and after fourteen hours of indecisive fighting the Germans retreated leaving some of their equipment and over 60 dead.

Luvungi, under Belgian colonial rule, was raided by German forces from modern-day Burundi on 12 January 1915 during the East African Campaign in World War I. Although small-scale, the raid ended in defeat and the German commander 
Karl Schimmer was killed. 

Mass rapes were reported in the town during the Kivu conflict in 2010, despite the presence of United Nations peacekeepers nearby.

References

External links
Our Experience in Luvungi at Foreign Policy (magazine)

Populated places in South Kivu
Democratic Republic of the Congo articles missing geocoordinate data